The Tanimbar monarch (Carterornis castus), or Loetoe monarch is a bird in the family Monarchidae endemic to Indonesia. It is found in the Tanimbar Islands.

Taxonomy and systematics
This subspecies was formerly placed in the genus Monarcha until moved to Carterornis in 2009. While the Tanimbar monarch was formerly considered a subspecies of the white-naped monarch (C. pileatus), it is now considered a separate species.

References

Tanimbar monarch
Birds of the Tanimbar Islands
Tanimbar monarch
Tanimbar monarch
Taxonomy articles created by Polbot